Dalla freemani is a species of butterfly in the family Hesperiidae. It is found in Guatemala.

References

Butterflies described in 1997
freemani